The men's 400 metre individual medley event at the 2010 Asian Games took place on 13 November 2010 at Guangzhou Aoti Aquatics Centre.

There were 15 competitors from 11 countries who took part in this event. Two heats were held. The heat in which a swimmer competed did not formally matter for advancement, as the swimmers with the top eight times from both field qualified for the finals.

Asian record holder Yuya Horihata from Japan won the gold medal with 4 minutes 13.35 seconds. Huang Chaosheng from China finished second, falling behind only 0.03 seconds.

Schedule
All times are China Standard Time (UTC+08:00)

Records

Results

Heats

Final

References
 16th Asian Games Results

External links 
 Men's 400m Individual Medley Heats Official Website
 Men's 400m Individual Medley Ev.No.2 Final Official Website

Swimming at the 2010 Asian Games